The 2018 Arkansas–Pine Bluff Golden Lions football team represents the University of Arkansas at Pine Bluff in the 2018 NCAA Division I FCS football season. The Golden Lions are led by first-year head coach Cedric Thomas and play their home games at Golden Lion Stadium in Pine Bluff, Arkansas as members of the West Division of the Southwestern Athletic Conference (SWAC).

Previous season
The Golden Lions finished the 2017 season 2–9, 1–6 in SWAC play to finish in last place in the West Division.

On November 20, 2017, head coach Monte Coleman was fired. He finished at APBU with a ten-year record of 40–71.

Preseason

SWAC football media day
During the SWAC football media day held in Birmingham, Alabama on July 13, 2018, the Golden Lions were predicted to finish last in the West Division.

Media poll

Presason All-SWAC Team
The Golden Lions had three players at four positions selected to Preseason All-SWAC Teams.

Offense
1st team

KeShawn Williams – Sr. RB

Defense
2nd team

Kevin Agee – Sr. DL

Special teams
1st team

Jamie Gillan – Sr. P

KeShawn Williams – Sr. KR

Schedule

Game summaries

Morehouse College

Cumberland

at South Dakota State

Prairie View A&M

at FIU

Jackson State

at Mississippi Valley State

at Grambling State

Alabama A&M

at Southern

at Texas Southern

References

Arkansas-Pine Bluff
Arkansas–Pine Bluff Golden Lions football seasons
Arkansas-Pine Bluff Golden Lions f